A. Richard Palmer, (also known as Richard Palmer)  is a marine biologist at the University of Alberta. Among other topics, he has written extensively on morphological asymmetry. In 2007, he was elected as a fellow of the Royal Society of Canada.

References

External links
University home page

Living people
Evolutionary biologists
Fellows of the Royal Society of Canada
Year of birth missing (living people)
Place of birth missing (living people)
Academic staff of the University of Alberta